Germany's Next Topmodel, Cycle 9 is the ninth season of the show that is aired on the German television network ProSieben. The show began to air on 6 February 2014 under the catch phrase Show Yourself. As in the last preceding years, a preselection was done and open castings were not part of the show anymore. The first episode started with 25 finalists, selected from 70 semifinalists.

The judging panel consists of Thomas Hayo and Wolfgang Joop. The prizes included a modeling contract with OneEins GmbH Management, a spread and cover in the German Cosmopolitan and an Opel Adams. The winner of the competition was 17-year-old Stefanie Giesinger from Kaiserlautern.

The international destinations for this cycle were Singapore, Los Angeles, Mumbai, Salt Lake City, Paris, New York City and Malé.

Episode summaries

Episode 1: Berlin to Singapore
Original airdate: 6 February 2014

The first episode of Germany's Next Topmodel 2014 starts at Berlin's Tempodrom where, out of the thousands who had applied and attended casting calls nationwide, 70 of Germany's most gorgeous women fought for the top 25 spots on offer. This year's judging panel along with host Heidi Klum, consists of regular judge Thomas Hayo and newcomer to the top model series (but renowned fashion designer) Wolfgang Joop. After the 25 finalists were chosen, Heidi announced that the girls would be flying to Singapore. Upon arrival to the luxurious Sentosa Island hotel, beds were chosen and friendships forged. The next day, the girls are met down by the pool with Heidi and this week's photographer Christian Anwander for their very first photo-shoot: a bikini shoot. Some girls excel, in particular Aminata, Ivana, Jolina and Nancy while others fall flat. The girls do a runway training afterwards where Nancy and Jolina surprise the judges, but in the end Ivana is deemed best. In the end it was Lisa S. and Luxembourgian contestant Jill who did not impress the judges, and both were eliminated from the competition.

Eliminated: Jill Schmitz & Lisa Seibert
Featured photographer: Christian Anwander

Episode 2: If Heidi does not come, then it is serious
Original airdate: 13 February 2014

This episode, the 23 remaining contestants the girls are put under the pressure of their very first runway challenge at one of Singapore's very own fashion shows, Digital Fashion Week, where Jolina is chosen to open and Nathalie to close the show. Later, a photo-shoot at Gardens by the Bay has the girls posing with a snake, where Ivana produces the best picture, followed by Jolina, Sarah and Aminata. Unable to attend both the Fashion Show and photo-shoot, Heidi leaves a recorded video telling the girls they are all heading to Los Angeles. Here, one by one, the girls are assessed on both their walk and photos. Unable to impress the judges this week is Franziska who is sent home, whilst the 18 remaining girls move into the mansion. Fata Hasanovic who was forced to withdraw due to a lack of a visa returned in cycle 11 where she placed third.

Quit: Pauline Cottin, Laura Haas, Ina Bartak & Fata Hasanovic
Chosen to open the fashion show: Jolina Fust
Chosen to close the fashion show: Nathalie Volk
Eliminated: Franziska Wimmer
Featured photographer: Christian Anwander

Episode 3: Makeovers!-Style Edition
Original airdate: 20 February 2014

In Episode 3, the girls receive their makeovers. Some find it hard to part with their old looks, whilst others are happy to undergo the change. Samantha is praised for her fantastic long hair that is dyed in orange. Later at the photo shoot, the girls will be flying high as this photo-shoot challenges them to overcome heights. Ivana, Jolina, and Samantha impress the judges the most with their sed cards, however, five girls are able to earn their immunity for their performances at the other photo shoot: Ivana, Nancy, Nathalie, Sainabou and Antonia. The judges also note Sarah's improvement in her walk, however, Stefanie, Jana, Emma and Laura are unable to impress leaving the latter as the eliminee for her lack of progress.

Immune from elimination: Antonia Balzer, Ivana Teklic, Nancy Nagel, Nathalie Volk & Sainabou Sosseh
Bottom four: Emma Kahlert, Jana Heinisch, Laura Kristen & Stefanie Giesinger
Eliminated: Laura Kristen
Featured photographer: Oliver S. & Brian Bowen Smith

Episode 4: Body Edition
Original airdate: 27 February 2014

With this week's focus on the body, the girls head to their casting for Shape magazine, where Stefanie, Betty, Simona, Samantha, Sainabou and Antonia impress the client. In the end, Antonia is the one to be booked. Later, the girls perform in the opening trailer shoot shot by Rankin. Heidi notes Nathalie, Aminata and Anna as stand-outs while Jolina, Stefanie, and Emma disappoint. At judging, Ivana and Aminata perform best while Sarah, Stefanie, Lisa, and Nancy are critiqued for their walks as well as Jolina and Emma for their video-shoot, thus placing in the bottom five. Stefanie fails at both and lands herself in the bottom two, however, it is Emma who the judges feel is just not ready yet and is sent packing.

Booked for job: Antonia Balzer
Bottom five: Emma Kahlert, Jolina Fust, Nancy Nagel, Sarah Weinfurter & Stefanie Giesinger
Eliminated: Emma Kahlert
Featured photographer: Michael Reh & Rankin
Guest judge: Alessandra Ambrosio

Episode 5: Boys Edition
Original airdate: 6 March 2014

With the focus of the week being interaction with male models, the girls head off to select male models for their shoot where Ivana flirts with one of the male models despite having a boyfriend. The shoot this week takes place on Malibu beach, shot by renowned photographer Gilles Bensimon. The girls have to shoot in pairs with male models, most of the girls leave Heidi disappointed, however, Ivana, Simona, and Nancy stand-out. The challenge later follows where the girls have to film a commercial with a male model, Samantha and Antonia leave Thomas Hayo unimpressed, while Lisa's performance is said to be horrible and even making judge Wolfgang Joop laugh, but it is Sarah who delivers the best performance earning herself immunity, with Sainabou being second. Lisa, Antonia, and Samantha are chastised at judging for their dull performances in both the shoot and the challenge, but Lisa enjoys kind of a puppy license while Samantha is said to have more potential, thus Antonia is sent home.

Challenge winner/Immune from elimination: Sarah Weinfurter
Bottom three: Antonia Balzer, Lisa Gelbrich & Samantha Brock
Eliminated: Antonia Balzer

Episode 6: Transformation Edition
Original airdate: 13 March 2014

The week starts with a casting for German Cosmopolitan where Jolina, Karlin, Nancy, and Anna reach the second round with only Jolina and Karlin booked. In the first photo shoot, the girls are divided into groups where some of them have to play the role of men or boys. Ivana, Nathalie, and Nancy are deemed best. In the second photo shoot, the girls are body painted and have to pose with spiders. The photographer Rankin books Karlin, Aminata, Betty, and Samantha for his magazine, but only Samantha's pictures are published in the magazine. Simona and Jana are sent home for their problems at the photo shoots.

Booked for job: Jolina Fust, Karlin Obiango & Samantha Brock
Immune from elimination: Aminata Sanogo, Betty Taube, Ivana Teklic & Nathalie Volk
Eliminated: Simona Hartl
Bottom two: Jana Heinisch & Sarah Weinfurter
Eliminated: Jana Heinisch
Featured photographer: Thomas Hayo & Rankin

Episode 7: Extreme Edition
Original airdate: 20 March 2014

In this week's photo shoot, the girls have to be hysterical divas who go ballistic, which makes Sarah, Lisa, Sainabou, and Aminata struggle while Ivana, Betty and Nathalie perform best. In the casting for Emmi AG Jolina, Stefanie, Samantha, Sarah, and Nancy reach the second round where Jolina gets her second job and thus flies to India. The girls have to present extreme outfits at panel, where Ivana's walk is, like always, deemed best. In the end, Sainabou is eliminated for her bad performance at both: photo shoot and runway.

Best photo: Betty Taube
Booked for job: Jolina Fust 
Bottom Three: Aminata Sanogo, Sainabou Sosseh & Sarah Weinfurter
Eliminated: Sainabou Sosseh
Featured photographer: Matt McCabe & Rankin

Episode 8: Road Trip Edition
Original airdate: 27 March 2014

In the beginning, Wolfgang Joop books Ivana and Samantha for his Wunderkind show at Paris Fashion Week. After that the girls do a photo shoot in Utah where Stefanie, Nathalie, and Betty perform best, while Lisa, Karlin, Sarah, and Nancy are unable to impress. It is also the first time for Ivana to fail at a photo shoot. The girls also produce a fashion film, where Ivana, Nancy, and Jolina impress while Stefanie, Lisa, Karlin, Sarah, and Anna fall flat. Ivana's walk is once again deemed best. In the end, Lisa is eliminated for being not as good as the other girls, not understanding the judges' critiques, and even being dull-witted at times.

Best photo: Stefanie Giesinger
Booked for job: Ivana Teklic & Samantha Brock
Bottom Three: Karlin Obiango, Lisa Gelbrich & Sarah Weinfurter
Eliminated: Lisa Gelbrich
Featured photographer: Christian Anwander & Thomas Hayo

Episode 9: Expression Edition
Original airdate: 3 April 2014

This week's first photo shoot takes place at an old train station where the girls have to cry as if they would move away. In the second photo shoot, they have to give different emotions they are told. Ivana is deemed best at the photo shoot.
Samantha and Sarah are the weakest at the photo shoots, and Nancy struggles on the runway heavily, thus making them land in the bottom three. In contrast to them, Ivana's and Jolina's walks are deemed perfect. Though reaching the next round, Nancy behaves rudely to Heidi when getting her photo, which annoys the judges.

Challenge winner: Ivana Teklic
Bottom Three: Nancy Nagel, Samantha Brock & Sarah Weinfurter
Eliminated: None
Featured photographer: Robert Erdmann & Thomas Hayo

Episode 10: Fashion Week Edition
Original airdate: 10 April 2014

The girls head back to Berlin for a big week of castings. The girls head to various designers where Jolina, Ivana, and Nancy are booked as runway models. Jolina is praised for being booked for all three shows. The girls also visit the casting for Joy magazine, where Anna, Samantha, and Karlin are selected. The rest of the girls tour Berlin's sights where Nathalie hypocritically asserts she is happy not to be chosen, saying she will only walk in Paris. The shoot takes place back in LA, however, Karlin's visa is rejected forcing her to remain in Berlin while she awaits a new one. Most of the girls impress at the photo shoot, with Ivana, Aminata, and Samantha performing best and Betty, Sarah, and Nathalie struggling. At judging, the girls walk in outfits designed by Wolfgang, where Sarah is once again castigated for regressing in performance, and she is sent home. Jolina is advised to show more personality.

Booked for job: Jolina Fust, Ivana Teklic, Nancy Nagel, Samantha Brock, Anna Wilken & Karlin Obiango
Bottom two: Betty Taube & Nathalie Volk
Eliminated: Sarah Weinfurter
Featured photographer: Enrique Badulescu

Episode 11: Sexy Edition
Original airdate: 17 April 2014

The week starts with a runway training where Ivana, Betty, and Aminata are deemed best while Samantha and Anna are the worst. Heidi and Wolfgang Joop try to persuade Jolina to let her hair to be cut short, but Jolina bursts in tears and refuses it. At the casting for Opel, Stefanie, Jolina, and Betty are the best, with Stefanie getting her first job. At the photo shoot, Stefanie, Samantha, and Anna struggle. These three are also the ones to struggle at the catwalk, where the girls have to walk in Victoria's Secret underwear and wings. While Stefanie reaches the next round because of her job, Samantha and Anna land in the bottom two. Though Anna quits the competition, Samantha is sent home.

Booked for job: Stefanie Giesinger
Bottom two: Anna Wilken & Samantha Brock
Quit: Anna Wilken
Eliminated: Samantha Brock
Featured photographer: Fransesco Carrozini

Episode 12: Girls Edition 
Original airdate: 24 April 2014

The girls have a press training where Betty earns herself immunity because of her excellent performance. This week's casting is for Maybelline. Jolina, Ivana, Stefanie, and Nathalie are the last four. As later revealed, it has been a race head to head between Jolina and Ivana that resulted in Jolinas sixth job. At the photo shoot where the girls have to pose with little children, Nancy bursts into tears missing her own son. Ivana, Stefanie, and Jolina perform best. Aminata struggles at the catwalk, which makes her the original eliminee, but she is saved after it is established asthma caused the problem. Jolina is also critiqued for her walk. Ivana even starts to debate with Wolfgang, defending Aminata. For the second time in the cycle, no girl is eliminated.

Re-entered: Karlin Obiango
Booked for job: Jolina Fust
Challenge winner/Immune from elimination: Betty Taube
Eliminated: None
Featured photographer: Christian Anwander & Kristian Schuller

Episode 13: Real World Edition 
Original airdate: 1 May 2014

This week's photo shoot is the cover of German Cosmopolitan, which is one of the winning prices. At the shoot, Betty, Stefanie, Jolina, Ivana, and Aminata are deemed best while Nancy and Karlin have problems. When visiting an agency, Jolina gets the offer to sign with Elite Model Management. At a casting for New York Fashion Week, only Jolina and Ivana reach the second round, with Ivana booked for her fourth job resulting in Ivana's immunity. At a press conference, Stefanie stirs everybody to tears when talking about her severe disease. After the catwalk, Nancy and Karlin are sent home.

Offer to sign with an agency: Jolina Fust
Booked for job: Ivana Teklic
Immune from elimination: Ivana Teklic
Eliminated: Nancy Nagel & Karlin Obiango
Featured photographer: Brian Bowen Smith

Episode 14: Semi-Finals 
Original airdate: 4 May 2014

It is the first time there are six girls in the semifinals. At the casting for Gillette Venus, Jolina reaches the second round once again, along with Betty and Nathalie. In the end, it is Betty who wins the casting. At the photo shoot, none of the girls struggle, but Ivana's picture is later deemed best. At the last catwalk before the final, only Ivana and Jolina are able to fully convince the judges. Jolina is the first girl to reach the final with having been booked for six jobs, but is critiqued for not showing enough personality. After her, Ivana, who has been booked for four jobs, is able to reach the final. The third girl to be called out is Aminata who is eliminated as well as Nathalie, which leaves Betty and Stefanie who are called out together. In the end, Stefanie reaches the final because of her progress and her amazing charm, which makes Betty the third eliminee. The three finalists and the 3 eliminated girls travel to the Maldives for a few days.

Booked for job: Betty Taube
Eliminated: Aminata Sanogo & Nathalie Volk
Bottom two: Betty Taube & Stefanie Giesinger
Eliminated: Betty Taube
Featured photographer: Kristian Schuller

Episode 15: Live Finale 
Original airdate: 8 May 2014

In the final, Jolina is deemed to be the best in the photo shoot, and Ivana wins the challenge to design an outfit herself and to present it on the runway. The girls also have to choose the staging and the music.
Ivana is eliminated first despite being this cycle's catwalk queen, being this cycle's most consistent candidate, and winning the design challenge where Wolfgang Joop states Ivana's outfit and walk were definitely the best. Wolfgang also asserts that Ivana was his favorite, but Heidi and Thomas voted for the other girls. Betty is chosen to open the Top 20 walk after online voting between the girls who did not reach the final.
In the end, Stefanie is chosen as the winner of the competition.

Top 20 walk opener: Betty Taube
Final three: Ivana Teklic, Jolina Fust and Stefanie Giesinger
Eliminated: Ivana Teklic
Final two: Jolina Fust & Stefanie Giesinger
Germany's Next Topmodel: Stefanie Giesinger
Featured photographer: Christian Anwander

Contestants
(ages stated are at start of contest)

Summaries

Results table

 The contestant quit the competition
 The contestant was immune from elimination
 The contestant was in danger of elimination
 The contestant was eliminated
 The contestant won the competition

Photo shoot guide
 Episode 1 photo shoot: B&W beauty shots in a pool
 Episode 2 photo shoot: Flora and fauna with snakes
 Episode 3 photo shoots: Professional comp cards; floating with balloons overlooking a roller coaster
 Episode 4 video shoot: Filming the opening sequence
 Episode 5 photo shoot: Posing in pairs on the beach with a male model
 Episode 6 photo shoots: Portraying both genders in pairs in B&W; posing with tarantulas in glitter body paint
 Episode 7 photo shoot: Hysterical divas in a restaurant
 Episode 8 photo shoots: Amerindian beauty; cowgirl fashion films
 Episode 9 photo shoot: Crying in 1920s fashion
 Episode 10 photo shoot: Jumping from a trampoline in colored gowns
 Episode 11 photo shoot: Hydrant sexy shoot
 Episode 12 photo shoot: Posing with lil' children
 Episode 13 photo shoot: Cosmopolitan covers
 Episode 14 photo shoot: Crashed sailing ship from Mars in couture
 Episode 15 photo shoot: Stage rock stars

Controversy
An article on Bild.de revealed the final three as being Ivana Teklic, Stefanie Giesinger, and Jolina Fust.

In February 2023, the Berliner Zeitung published an article about the show with the headline: "Why isn't Germany’s Next Topmodel actually canceled?"

Post Topmodel careers
 Pauline Cottin has signed with ONEeins.
 Fata Hasonivic has signed with ONEeins.
 Laura Kristen has signed with ONEeins.
 Emma Kahlert has signed with ONEeins.
 Antonia Balzer has signed with ONEeins.
 Simona Hartl has signed with ONEeins. She walked at Genf fashion week.
 Jana Heinisch has signed with Louisa Models.
 Sainabou Sosseh has signed with ONEeins.
 Lisa Gelbrich has signed with ONEeins
 Sarah Weinfurter has signed with ONEeins.
 Samantha Brock has been signed with ONEeins. She has walked at Berlin fashion week.
 Anna Wilken has signed with Munich Models. She walked at Berlin fashion week and Paris fashion week.
 Karlin Obiango has signed with ONEeins. She released a single called "Wunderkind".
 Nancy Nagel has signed with ONEeins
 Betty Taube has signed a modeling contract with ONEeins. She has walked for Guido Maria Kretschmer at Berlin fashion week. She had a TV spot for Chixx. She appeared in the show Topmodel on Tour, and had her own feature called Betty Goes Tokyo in the German tabloid program Taff. 
 Nathalie Volk has signed with Modelwerk in Hamburg and has modeled for Swiss lingerie-retailer Vicky Bonheur. She participated in the German version of I'm a Celebrity...Get Me Out of Here!
 Aminata Sanogo has signed with Mega Model in Hamburg. She appeared on the cover of German Stern magazine.
 Ivana Teklic has signed with Pars Management and Women Management. She walked for Dior, Wunderkind, Calvin Klein, Ralph & Russo, Julien Macdonald, Roksanda Ilincic and Roberto Cavalli and other designers at Paris, Milan and London fashion week, became the face of Joffroy make-up and a campaign for Gucci, had a spread in Vogue, Kaltblut, Flanelle, Perk, Factice and Up magazines and modelled for the covers of Quality, Perk and Up magazines, thus making her one of the most successful alumni of Germany's Next Topmodel. 
 Jolina Fust was signed with ONEeins. She is now signed with Munich Models and Next Model Management in London. She has walked at Berlin fashion week.
 Stefanie Giesinger has collected all of her prizes as the winner, including the cover of Cosmopolitan, a TV-commercial for Opel, and a modeling contract with ONEeins. She walked for Wunderkind and at Milan and Berlin fashion week and she walked for Dolce & Gabbana for Milan Fashion Week.

References

Germany's Next Topmodel
2014 German television seasons
Television shows filmed in Singapore
Television shows filmed in Los Angeles
Television shows filmed in Utah
Television shows filmed in New York City
Television shows filmed in India
Television shows filmed in France
Television shows filmed in the Maldives